Ian Murray (born 10 August 1976) is a British politician who has served as Shadow Secretary of State for Scotland since 2020, and previously from 2015 to 2016. A member of the Labour Party, he has been Member of Parliament (MP) for Edinburgh South since 2010.

He previously served as a City of Edinburgh Councillor for the wards of Liberton and Liberton/Gilmerton from 2003 to 2010. Since 2019, Murray has been the only Labour Party MP representing a Scottish constituency and had previously been so from 2015 to 2017. A critic of former Labour Party Leader Jeremy Corbyn, in 2020, it was revealed that Murray was initially planning to defect from the Labour Party and join The Independent Group, which later became Change UK; Murray decided against joining the seven defectors and remained as a Labour MP.

Early life and career
Murray was born in Edinburgh, to a cooper father and shop assistant mother in 1976. Brought up in the Wester Hailes area of Edinburgh, he attended Dumbryden Primary School, then Wester Hailes Education Centre. Upon completing his secondary school education, Murray read Social Policy and Law at the University of Edinburgh's Academy of Government, graduating with an honours degree (M.A. Hons.) at the age of twenty. While studying at university, he had a part-time job in a local fish & chip shop before setting up and running a pizza delivery service.

After graduation, Murray worked for Royal Blind in pensions management, before being head-hunted by an Edinburgh-based internet television station (Worldart.com) during the dot-com boom where he helped to build a new online TV station. Despite his efforts, the company ran out of funding and he was made redundant; he then founded his own event management business (100 mph Events Ltd). Murray also organised a student exchange programme in Nepal to fund school buildings and staff.

Political career
In 2003, Murray stood in the local elections for Liberton winning the seat for Labour at the age of 27; he later represented the larger Liberton/Gilmerton ward from 2007 to 2010.

Murray was returned for the seat of Edinburgh South at the 2010 general election. He served on the Business, Innovation and Skills Select Committee and the Environmental Audit Select Committee. In 2011, he was appointed to the Official Opposition frontbench as Shadow Minister for Trade and Investment.

At the 2014 Scottish independence referendum, Murray campaigned against independence. He claimed to have encountered hostility from independence activists and reported that his office premises had been plastered with pro-independence "Yes" stickers, which were immediately removed.

Murray was re-elected as MP for Edinburgh South at the 2015 general election, with an increased share of the vote and an increased majority. He was the only Scottish Labour MP returned. He was appointed Shadow Secretary of State for Scotland on 11 May 2015 by acting Labour Party leader Harriet Harman. He was re-appointed to the same role by new leader Jeremy Corbyn in September 2015.

In January 2016, Corbyn made his first frontbench reshuffle. Three shadow ministers resigned in protest and were criticised by Corbyn ally John McDonnell as being part of a "narrow right wing clique" aligned with the Blairite Progress group. Murray, a Progress member, was interviewed on the Sunday Politics Scotland programme on 10 January and criticised McDonnell, saying he should "ramp down the rhetoric".

On 26 June 2016, two days after the EU referendum, Murray resigned with other members of the Shadow Cabinet, citing a lack of confidence in Corbyn's leadership ability to win a general election. He then nominated Owen Smith in his failed leadership challenge against Corbyn. After Corbyn's successful re-election as Labour leader with an increased majority, Murray said he would only return to the frontbench if Corbyn's reinstated Shadow Cabinet elections and stopped using the threat of deselection to enforce loyalty. He later accused Corbyn of being "all over the place" on potential Labour cooperation with the SNP. His replacement as Shadow Scottish Secretary, Dave Anderson refused to rule out a deal with the SNP at Westminster.

Prior to the 2019 general election, Murray faced the threat of deselection when Unite the Union announced it would vote to trigger an open selection. Local members refused to back such a contest so it could not proceed. Following the election, he again became Labour's only MP in Scotland, but with a decreased majority of 11,095 while the party's vote share decreased by 8.5% in Scotland.

On 7 January 2020, Murray announced that he would stand for election to be Deputy Leader of the Labour Party in the deputy leadership election. During the contest, he received the backing of former Prime Ministers Gordon Brown and Tony Blair. Murray finished in fourth place and was appointed as Shadow Secretary of State for Scotland by new party leader Keir Starmer.

In September 2020, it was reported that Murray had considered joining the breakaway group of MPs initially called The Independent Group (later Change UK), but pulled out at the last minute after deciding the move risked handing 'my seat to someone from the Corbyn wing of the party'.

Murray nominated Anas Sarwar in the 2021 Scottish Labour leadership election.

Personal life

Murray supports Edinburgh-based football team Hearts and was previously Chair of the 'Foundation of Hearts', a bid by a fans' group to buy-out the club from administration. He stepped down in May 2015 in order to focus on his parliamentary duties, and was duly replaced by the current Chair, Brian Cormack. On 20 August 2020, Murray's partner Mariam gave birth to a daughter, Zola.

References

External links
Official website

Party profile 

1976 births
Alumni of the University of Edinburgh
Ian
Councillors in Edinburgh
Living people
Members of the Parliament of the United Kingdom for Edinburgh constituencies
Politicians from Edinburgh
21st-century Scottish businesspeople
Scottish Labour MPs
UK MPs 2010–2015
UK MPs 2015–2017
UK MPs 2017–2019
UK MPs 2019–present
Scottish Labour councillors